Teloga Creek is a stream in the U.S. state of Georgia.

Teloga is a name derived from the Muscogee language meaning "pea creek".

References

Rivers of Georgia (U.S. state)
Rivers of Chattooga County, Georgia